Barge Bay is a former settlement in the Canadian province of Newfoundland and Labrador. The community was resettled.

It is located on a bay with the same name on the southeast coast of Labrador and lies 10 miles northeast of Red Bay.

See also 
 List of ghost towns in Newfoundland and Labrador

References 

Ghost towns in Newfoundland and Labrador